Psiliglossa is a circum-Mediterranean and Central-Asian genus of potter wasps with seven known species.

References

 Giordani Soika, 1974. Revisione della sottofamiglia Raphiglossinae (Hym. Vesp.). Bollettino del Museo Civico di Storia Naturale di Venezia 25 : 107–146.

Biological pest control wasps
Potter wasps
Taxa named by William Wilson Saunders